Andrew R. Jones is a visual effects artist most known for being part of the Oscar-winning team that did the visuals to Avatar and The Jungle Book.

Jones directed a segment of The Animatrix, "The Final Flight of the Osiris".

Oscars
Both of these are in the category of Best Visual Effects

77th Academy Awards-Nominated for I, Robot. Nomination shared with Joe Letteri, Erik Nash and John Nelson. Lost to Spider-Man 2. 
82nd Academy Awards-Avatar. Shared with Richard Baneham, Joe Letteri and Stephen Rosenbaum. Won. 
89th Academy Awards-The Jungle Book. Shared with Robert Legato, Adam Valdez, and Dan Lemmon. Won.
92nd Academy Awards-The Lion King. Shared with Robert Legato, Adam Valdez, and Elliot Newman. Lost to 1917

Selected filmography

The Lion King (2019)
The Jungle Book (2016)
World War Z (2013)
Avatar (2009)
I, Robot (2004)
Final Fantasy: The Spirits Within (2001)
Godzilla (1998)
Titanic (1997)

References

External links

Living people
Annie Award winners
Best Visual Effects Academy Award winners
Best Visual Effects BAFTA Award winners
Special effects people
Year of birth missing (living people)